Hickok45 is a YouTube and Full30 channel featuring videos about firearms. The videos are hosted by Greg Kinman (born July 11, 1950), a retired middle-school English teacher and former sheriff's auxiliary officer. Hickok45 videos also appear on Full30, a video streaming platform dedicated specifically to firearms. HICKOK45 is a registered trademark of Hickok 45, LLC.

Videos 
Hickok45's videos demonstrate a wide variety of firearms, both historic  and modern, and typically present an in-depth discussion of the history and functionality of each firearm. His early videos often showed him shooting Old West weaponry and wearing cowboy outfits. Over time, he expanded his presentations to include a greater variety of weapons, while emphasizing safety. He tends to prefer Glock pistols over those of other manufacturers. While most videos feature Greg, with his son John filming, John has occasionally appeared in videos as well.

Hickok45 has become famous for videos in which he shoots pumpkins with firearms, destroys watermelons and two-liter soda bottles, or cuts down saplings and Christmas trees using various guns. These videos have appeared in media in Vietnam, France, India, and Germany.

In 2010, Jay Leno showed a Hickok45 pumpkin carving video on The Tonight Show.

Personal life 
Greg Kinman attended Austin Peay State University in Clarksville, Tennessee, where he played center position on the college basketball team for two seasons, 1970–71 and 1971–72. He decided to forgo his senior season as he felt that basketball would not become his profession; he also noted that he was unable to gain weight. He has declared himself to be 6'8".

Originally from Kentucky, Kinman lives in Cheatham County, Tennessee. He is a retired English teacher. In 2015, he was featured in a webinar by distance learning organization the Sonoran Desert Institute.

See also
FPSRussia
Forgotten Weapons
List of YouTube personalities

References

External links

Hickok45's channel on Full30
 

YouTube channels
2007 web series debuts
Living people
1950 births